Interstate 78 (I-78) is an east–west Interstate Highway stretching from Union Township, Lebanon County, Pennsylvania, in the west to the Holland Tunnel and New York City in the east.

Much of I-78 west of Allentown predates the Interstate Highway System as a freeway upgrade of U.S. Route 22 (US 22), which runs concurrently with I-78 between Bethel Township and Upper Macungie Township. The Interstate, originally planned as Interstate 80N (I-80N), was supposed to continue its concurrency with US 22 to the New Jersey state line but was realigned to the south due to local opposition. Two auxiliary routes, Interstate 178 (I-178) and I-378, were also planned as spurs into Allentown and Bethlehem respectively, but I-178 was never built and I-378 became Pennsylvania Route 378 (PA 378) since it no longer connected to I-78. Improvement of the highway in Berks County is currently underway.

Route description

Lebanon and Berks counties
I-78 begins at an interchange with I-81 in Union Township in Lebanon County, heading east as a four-lane freeway. In Lebanon County, I-78 is known as the 78th Division Highway. The road passes under PA 72 and turns northeast through a mix of farmland and woodland, crossing the Swatara Creek into Swatara Township. The freeway continues through agricultural areas with some trees, curving east and entering Bethel Township. I-78 passes north of the community of Fredericksburg and comes to an eastbound exit and westbound entrance with the northern terminus of PA 343. Following this, the freeway passes through more rural areas with some nearby development and reaches a westbound exit and eastbound entrance with US 22 (William Penn Highway). At this point, US 22 becomes concurrent with I-78 and the median of the freeway narrows from a grassy median to a Jersey barrier.

I-78/US 22 enters Bethel Township in Berks County and heads east-northeast through agricultural areas to the south of the Blue Mountain ridge, coming to a diamond interchange with PA 645 north of the community of Frystown. The road continues through farmland with some warehouses and reaches a diamond interchange with PA 501 north of the community of Bethel. The freeway heads through a mix of farms and woods, passing to the south of Grimes Airport and coming to a right-in/right-out interchange with Court Street eastbound and Frantz Road westbound; this interchange has no access across the freeway. I-78/US 22 soon reaches a diamond interchange with Midway Road as it passes through more rural land, coming to a diamond interchange with PA 419 south of the community of Schubert. Past this interchange, the road runs through a mix of farms and woods, crossing the Little Swatara Creek into Upper Tulpehocken Township. The freeway reaches a diamond interchange with PA 183 north of the community of Strausstown and continues through agricultural areas with some woodland. I-78/US 22 crosses Northkill Creek into Upper Bern Township and comes to a diamond interchange with Mountain Road north of the community of Shartlesville. At this point, I-78/US 22 becomes the CMSgt. Richard L. Etchberger Memorial Highway, in honor of Richard Etchberger. Following this interchange, the road heads northeast through farm fields with some trees and homes and crosses into Tilden Township.

In Tilden Township, the freeway continues northeast and reaches a partial cloverleaf interchange with PA 61 in a business area that includes a  Cabela's store. Past PA 61, I-78/US 22 comes to a bridge over the Reading Blue Mountain and Northern Railroad's Reading Division line and the Schuylkill River. Upon crossing the river, I-78/US 22 enters the borough of Hamburg and passes through residential areas, coming to a diamond interchange at North 4th Street that serves Hamburg. The road leaves Hamburg for Windsor Township and heads through agricultural areas with some woods and homes, curving to the east. Farther east, the parallel Blue Mountain ridge heads further north from the freeway. I-78/US 22 crosses into Greenwich Township and comes to a partial cloverleaf interchange with PA 143 north of the borough of Lenhartsville. The CMSgt. Richard L. Etchberger Memorial Highway name for I-78/US 22 ends at this interchange. Past this interchange, the road crosses Maiden Creek and runs through a mix of farm fields and woodland. Farther east, the freeway reaches a diamond interchange with PA 737 south of the community of Krumsville. The road continues east through rural land with some nearby development, passing through the northern corner of Maxatawny Township.

Lehigh and Northampton counties

I-78/US 22 enters Weisenberg Township in Lehigh County where the freeway becomes the Walter J. Dealtrey Memorial Highway and continues east through farms and woods in the Lehigh Valley, passing north of the community of New Smithville. The road passes south of warehouses and comes to a diamond interchange with PA 863. Following this interchange, the freeway heads to the south of more warehouses and runs through more rural areas with some homes, crossing into Upper Macungie Township. I-78/US 22 runs between farm fields to the north and warehouses and industrial development to the south before it comes to a cloverleaf interchange with PA 100 in a business area in the community of Fogelsville. After the PA 100 interchange, the freeway widens to six lanes and heads east through industrial areas, coming to a bridge over Norfolk Southern Railway's C&F Secondary railroad line before curving northeast. In the community of Kuhnsville, US 22 splits from I-78 at an eastbound exit and westbound entrance by heading northeast on a freeway called the Lehigh Valley Thruway. From here, I-78 continues east-southeast as a four-lane freeway, passing residential subdivisions with some commercial development. The freeway continues southeast and passes over I-476 (Pennsylvania Turnpike Northeast Extension) before it comes to a westbound exit and eastbound entrance with the PA 309 freeway.

At this point, PA 309 becomes concurrent with I-78 and the freeway enters Lower Macungie Township, widening to six lanes and running past commercial development to the southwest of the Dorney Park & Wildwater Kingdom amusement park. The freeway reaches a partial cloverleaf interchange with the northern terminus of US 222 and the southern terminus of PA 222 at Hamilton Boulevard, which provides access to the cities of Allentown and Reading. Following this interchange, the road crosses into South Whitehall Township and heads east between residential areas to the north and farm fields to the south, before entering Salisbury Township and passing north of Lehigh Valley Hospital–Cedar Crest. Past the hospital, I-78/PA 309 comes to a partial cloverleaf interchange with the northern terminus of the southern section of PA 29 at Cedar Crest Boulevard before running between residential areas to the north and office buildings to the south. The freeway enters the city of Allentown and runs through woodland, crossing Little Lehigh Creek before it passes through a small section of Salisbury Township. The road heads back into Allentown and runs near residential areas, passing south of Allentown Queen City Municipal Airport before it comes to a partial cloverleaf interchange at Lehigh Street. I-78/PA 309 runs near industrial areas and passes over Norfolk Southern Railway's Reading Line before coming to a westbound exit ramp serving Emaus Avenue. The freeway passes near neighborhoods before it leaves Allentown for Salisbury Township, where it ascends forested South Mountain. The highway comes to an eastbound exit and westbound entrance with Rock Road that provides a connection to PA 145 in the community of Summit Lawn, at which point it crosses into Upper Saucon Township. Following this, the freeway turns southeast and comes to an interchange with the southern terminus of PA 145 in the community of Lanark, at which point PA 309 splits from I-78 by heading southeast on a surface road toward the borough of Quakertown. From here, I-78 turns northeast, narrowing to four lanes with the median changing from a Jersey barrier to a grassy median. The road heads between South Mountain to the northwest and a mix of farm fields, woods, and development to the southeast.

I-78 enters Lower Saucon Township in Northampton County and passes over PA 378 as it curves north near residential development. The road turns to the east-northeast and runs between forested South Mountain to the north and farmland and homes to the south, entering the city of Bethlehem. The freeway crosses the Saucon Creek and becomes the border between Bethlehem to the north and the borough of Hellertown to the south before it comes to a partial cloverleaf interchange with PA 412 that serves Bethlehem and Hellertown. Following this interchange, I-78 fully enters Bethlehem before it crosses back into Lower Saucon Township, turning to the northeast and running through wooded areas with some farm fields and homes, heading across the East Branch Saucon Creek. The road comes to a trumpet interchange with the southern terminus of the PA 33 freeway, which heads north toward the Pocono Mountains region. Past this interchange, the freeway crosses into Williams Township and continues through rural areas with some development, crossing into the borough of Glendon. I-78 turns east as it passes south of industrial areas, leaving Glendon for Williams Township. The road comes to a diamond interchange with Morgan Hill Road, which heads north into the city of Easton and provides access to PA 611 via city streets. Past this interchange, the freeway widens to six lanes and passes near residential and commercial development, coming to a westbound welcome center and a westbound toll plaza for the I-78 Toll Bridge. From here, I-78 runs through wooded areas and turns southeast, heading onto the I-78 Toll Bridge, which carries the freeway over PA 611 and the Delaware Canal before crossing the Delaware River where I-78 enters New Jersey.

History
Construction of the freeway between Lebanon and Lehigh counties took place between 1950 and 1970, originally as an upgraded alignment of US 22. All of I-78 was completed by 1989. When the Interstate Highway System numbers were first assigned in 1957, the route was planned as I-80N. Prior to the late 1960s, I-78 was to be routed on the Lehigh Valley Thruway across to Phillipsburg, New Jersey, continuing the concurrency with US 22; however, because of heavy opposition by residents of Phillipsburg, the Pennsylvania Department of Transportation (PennDOT) and the New Jersey Department of Transportation (NJDOT) opted to build the new southerly route I-78 follows today.

Interstate 178

Interstate 178 (I-178) was a proposed spur from I-78 but was canceled because the Liberty Bell Museum was in the path of the proposed expressway. Additionally, locals opposed the destruction of Sixth and Seventh Streets to accommodate the highway. The planned northern terminus would have been between the 15th Street and PA 145 interchanges. If built, I-178 would have connected US 22, formerly designated I-78, into Allentown.

This route was shown in Rand McNally atlases in the late 1960s but was not included in the 1971 federal Interstate route log. The route was supposed to end near Muhlenberg College.

Interstate 378

I-378 was the designation for a spur route that would extend from I-78 into Bethlehem. At the time, I-78 was designated as the Lehigh Valley Thruway, concurrent with US 22. Unlike I-178, the route was built. When I-78 was later redirected south of this area, I-378 had no direct connection to I-78 and therefore was renumbered to PA 378. The route still remains, as a freeway with exits and their own numbers.

When I-178 and I-378 were planned (and I-378 was built), I-78 ran the length of the Lehigh Valley Thruway. Later, I-78 was rerouted onto a bypass route south of the Thruway. This was due to opposition to continue the concurrency with the Lehigh Valley Thruway into New Jersey.

Improvements in Berks County

In 2013, PennDOT announced plans to improve a portion of I-78 in eastern Berks County. The project will redesign the PA 737 interchange, add truck lanes, widen lanes and shoulders, and raise the height of three overpasses. Construction began in 2015 and is planned to be completed in 2025 at a cost of $412.6 million. In 2020, a project began to improve the section of I-78 in Hamburg by reconstructing and reconfiguring the PA 61 interchange and widening and rehabilitating the bridges over the Schuylkill River and Port Clinton Avenue. Construction on this project is planned to be completed in December 2025 at a cost of $125.4 million.

Exit list

See also

References

External links

Pennsylvania Highways: Interstate 78
I-78 at AARoads.com
Pennsylvania Roads - I-78
Steve Anderson's PhillyRoads.com: Allentown Spur Route (unbuilt I-178)
Steve Anderson's PhillyRoads.com: Bethlehem Spur Route (PA 378, former I-378)

 Pennsylvania
78
Roads in the Harrisburg, Pennsylvania area
Transportation in Lebanon County, Pennsylvania
Transportation in Berks County, Pennsylvania
Transportation in Lehigh County, Pennsylvania
Transportation in Northampton County, Pennsylvania